Bau or BAU may refer to:

Places 
 Bau (island) in Fiji
 Bau District, Fiji
 Bau (village), Fiji
 Bau, Sarawak, a mining town in Malaysia
 Bau, Sudan,  in Blue Nile State, also Bau, Baw, Bāw, Darfung, Wisho or Wisko
 Bauru Airport, Brazil, IATA airport code

Organizations and institutions 
 Bahçeşehir University, Istanbul, Turkey
 Bangladesh Agricultural University, Bangladesh 
 Behavioral Analysis Unit of the US FBI
 Beirut Arab University
 Baekseok Arts University, Seoul, South Korea

Other uses 
 Bau (goddess), in Sumerian and Akkadian mythology
 Bau (musician) (born 1962), Cape Verdean musician
 Bau language (disambiguation)
 Business as usual (disambiguation)
 Bau (album), a 2006 Mina album
 Gordon Bau (1907–1975), US make-up expert
 Binding antibody unit, a unit defined by the WHO for the comparison of assays detecting the same class of immunoglobulins with the same specificity

See also 
 Ba U